Marcel Godivier (Versailles, 17 January 1887 – Dreux, 9 February 1963) was a French professional road bicycle racer., who won two stages in the 1911 Tour de France, and finished in the top 10 of the overall classification twice.

Major results

1908
Tour de France:
9th place general classification
1909
París-Chateauroux
1911
Tour de France:
Winner stage 12
Winner stage 15
6th place general classification
París-Beaugency
1917
Le Mont St Michel-París

External links 

French male cyclists
1887 births
1963 deaths
French Tour de France stage winners
Sportspeople from Versailles, Yvelines
Cyclists from Île-de-France